Scopula obliquifascia is a moth of the  family Geometridae. It is found in Cameroon and Equatorial Guinea (Bioko).

References

Moths described in 1999
obliquifascia
Moths of Africa
Fauna of Bioko